Elizabeth "Lizzie" Clarice Aguzzi (4 February 1856 – 1938), was a British Circus equestrian performer.

She was born at 3 Felix Street, Lambeth, London, as the daughter of the equestrian performer Antoni Aguzzi (1809/10–1880) and Helen Schmidt (1824–1903). She was a famous performer in the Circus stage of her time, known from the 1870s and onward. She was foremost famed as a bareback and trick act rider.

References 

1856 births
1938 deaths
British equestrians
British circus performers
Acrobats
19th-century circus performers
20th-century circus performers